The Tell Atlas is a mountain chain over  in length, belonging to the Atlas mountain ranges in North Africa, stretching mainly across northern Algeria, with ends in both north-eastern Morocco and north-western Tunisia.

Several large cities such as the Algerian capital, Algiers, with ~1,500,000 residents (2005) and Oran with ~770,000 residents (2005) lie at the base of the Tell Atlas. The Algerian city Constantine with approximately 505,000 residents (2005) lies 80 km inland and directly in the mountains at 650 meters in elevation. A number of smaller towns and villages are situated within the Tell; for example, Chiffa is nestled within the Chiffa gorge.

Geography
The Tell Atlas runs parallel to the Mediterranean coast. Together with the Saharan Atlas to the south, it forms the northernmost of two more or less parallel ranges which approach one another towards the east, remaining quite distinct from one another in Western Algeria and merging in Eastern Algeria. At the western end, it ends at the Rif and Middle Atlas ranges in Morocco. The Tell Atlas is also a distinct physiographic section of the larger Atlas Mountains province, which in turn is part of the larger African Alpine System physiographic division.

The Tell Atlas and the Saharan Atlas form two natural barriers, the first against the Mediterranean and the second against the Sahara. Between them lies the valley of the Chelif and various lesser rivers.

South of the Tell Atlas is the high plateau of the Hautes Plaines (~1000 m in elevation) with level terrain where water collects during the wet season, forming large shallow salt lakes which become salt flats as they dry. Agriculture includes grazing of sheep and goats on the grass in better-watered high plateau areas and some farming; dry-land barley is grown there.

The Chelif is a 725 km long river with headwaters in the Tell Atlas to its discharge into the Mediterranean. The Chelif is characterized by an extremely fertile valley. Other noteworthy rivers having their sources in this range are the Medjerda and the Seybouse River.
Only seasonal streams are found flowing south from the Tell Atlas.

Climate and vegetation
The Tell Atlas has a typical Mediterranean climate, warm with dry summers and mild, rainy winters with snow at upper elevations. As a consequence, the northern slopes of the Tell Atlas are forested with the endemic Abies numidica, and Atlas cedar, pine, and cork oak. In the summer a hot, dry wind, the Sirocco, blows north from the Sahara across the Tell Atlas, causing dusty, dry conditions along the northern coast of Africa.

Despite the arid climate, some agriculture for barley and wheat farming is found in the Tell Atlas region. The Chiffa gorge is situated within the Tell Atlas; this location is one of the few remaining habitats for the endangered primate, the Barbary macaque, Macaca sylvanus.

See also
List of mountains in Algeria
Saharan Atlas

References

External links

Tell Atlas - The Great Soviet Encyclopedia

Mountain ranges of the Atlas Mountains
Maghreb
Mountain ranges of Morocco
Mountain ranges of Algeria
Physiographic sections
Mountain ranges of Tunisia